This is a list of surfaces, by Wikipedia page.

See also List of algebraic surfaces, List of curves, Riemann surface.

Minimal surfaces
 Catalan's minimal surface
 Costa's minimal surface
 Catenoid
 Enneper surface
 Gyroid
 Helicoid
 Lidinoid
 Riemann's minimal surface
 Saddle tower
 Scherk surface
 Schwarz minimal surface
 Triply periodic minimal surface

Ruled surfaces
 Catalan surface
 Right conoid
 Conical surface
 helicoid
 Developable rollers (sphericon, oloid)
 Hyperboloid of one sheet (doubly ruled)
 Hyperbolic paraboloid (doubly ruled) 
 Rational normal scroll
 Regulus

Non-orientable surfaces

Klein bottle
Real projective plane
Cross-cap
Roman surface
Boy's surface

Quadrics 

Sphere
Spheroid
Oblate spheroid
Cone (geometry)
Ellipsoid
Hyperboloid of one sheet
Hyperboloid of two sheets
Hyperbolic paraboloid (a ruled surface)
Paraboloid

Pseudospherical surfaces
Dini's surface
Pseudosphere

Algebraic surfaces
See the list of algebraic surfaces.
 Cayley cubic
 Barth sextic
 Clebsch cubic
 Monkey saddle (saddle-like surface for 3 legs.)
 Torus
 Dupin cyclide (inversion of a torus)
 Whitney umbrella

Miscellaneous surfaces

 
surfaces